Llidiardau is a small hamlet in Gwynedd, North Wales, approximately 4 miles northwest of  Bala, on an unnamed road, 2.3 miles from Arenig Fawr and in the shadow of Mynydd Nodol. The community population taken at the 2011 census was 20.

Llidiardau Chapel
Llidiardau Chapel was built in 1811 by the Calvinistic Methodists and enlarged in 1831. In 1860 it was rebuilt into its present form, aside from modifications in 1900. It is a Grade II listed building owing to its good state of preservation. Services are no longer held here, and are instead conducted at Talybont chapel, just over a mile and a half away in Rhyd-uchaf.

Governance
Llidiardau is within the electoral ward of Llandderfel and the parish of Llanycil.

References

Hamlets in Wales
Populated places in Gwynedd